The 1993 Norwegian Football Cup Final was the final match of the 1993 Norwegian Football Cup, the 88th season of the Norwegian Football Cup, the premier Norwegian football cup competition organized by the Football Association of Norway (NFF). The match was played on 24 October 1993 at the Ullevaal Stadion in Oslo, and was contested between the Tippeligaen side Bodø/Glimt and the First Division side Strømsgodset. Bodø/Glimt defeated Strømsgodset 2–0 to claim the Norwegian Cup for a second time in their history.

Match

Details

References

1993
Football Cup
FK Bodø/Glimt matches
Strømsgodset Toppfotball matches
Sports competitions in Oslo
1990s in Oslo
October 1993 sports events in Europe